

The Mesosemiini are one of the tribes of metalmark butterflies (family Riodinidae). They are the basalmost living tribe of the Riodininae, outside the main radiation together with the slightly more advanced Eurybiini.

Genera
As numerous Riodinidae genera have not yet been unequivocally assigned to a tribe, the genus list is preliminary.

In each subtribe, the genera are arranged in phylogenetic sequence, from the most plesiomorphic to the most apomorphic.

Subtribe Mesosemiina
Eunogyra
Teratophthalma
Mesosemia
Leucochimona
Semomesia
Mesophthalma
Perophthalma

Subtribe Napaeina
Hyphilaria
Napaea - includes Cremna
Voltinia - includes Eucorna
Ionotus - formerly in Cremna
Hermathena
Ithomiola

Some notable Mesosemiini species from the Amazon
Mesosemiina
 Mesophthalma idotea Westwood, 1851
 Mesosemia anthaerice (Hewitson, 1859)
 Mesosemia asa 
 Mesosemia calypso 
 Mesosemia cippus 
 Mesosemia coea (Hübner, 1819)
 Mesosemia eumene 
 Mesosemia euphyne (Cramer, 1777)
 Mesosemia hyphaea
 Mesosemia ibycus (Hewitson, 1859)
 Mesosemia ibycus parishi 
 Mesosemia macella Hewitson, 1859
 Mesosemia magete 
 Mesosemia melaene 
 Mesosemia melese Hewitson, 1860
 Mesosemia melpia 
 Mesosemia messeis 
 Mesosemia methion 
 Mesosemia metope 
 Mesosemia minos 
 Mesosemia philocles (Linnaeus, 1758)
 Mesosemia sifia 
 Mesosemia steli (Hewitson, 1857)
 Mesosemia tenura
 Mesosemia thymetina
 Mesosemia ulrica 
 Perophthalma tullius (Fabricius, 1782)

Napaeina
 Hyphilaria anophthalma 
 Hyphilaria parthensis (Westwood, 1851)
 Hyphilaria thasus 
 Napaea actoris (Cramer, 1776)
 Napaea eucharila (Bates, 1867)
 Napaea nepos

Footnotes

References
  (2007): Tree of Life Web Project - Mesosemiini Bates, 1859. Version of 2007-JUN-04. Retrieved 2008-JUL-07.
  (2007): Butterflies of Southern Amazonia. Neotropical Butterflies, Mission, Texas.
  (2008): Markku Savela's Lepidoptera and some other life forms: Riodinidae. Version of 2008-FEB-23. Retrieved 2008-JUL-07.

 
Riodininae
Taxa named by Henry Walter Bates
Butterfly tribes